First Shot Live is a 1979 live mini-album by Danish rock band Warm Guns. It was the band's first release, recorded at their first-ever live performance.

At the concert, Warm Guns supported Danish punk band Lost Kids, whose female vocalist, Pussi Punk, guested on the song "Invisible Man". Per Møller left Warm Guns in 1979 and later recorded "Killing for Fun" with Anne Linnet Band on the album Cha Cha Cha (1982). Lars Muhl recorded "Elevator" on his solo album When Angels Fall (1991).

Track listing 
All songs by Lars Muhl, except "Killing for Fun" by Per Møller.

Side 1 
 "Hip Shot" – 2:36 
 "Killing for Fun" – 3:47 
 "Elevator" – 3:16 
 "Never Lose Your Heart in the City" – 3:37

Side 2 
 "Talk to Me" – 4:46 
 "Invisible Man" – 5:21 
 "Run 'N' Hide" – 2:38

Personnel 
 Lars Muhl –  vocals, piano
 Lars Hybel –  guitar, backing vocals
 Per Møller –  guitar, backing vocals
 Jacob Perbøll –  bass
 Jens G. Nielsen –  drums
Additional musicians
 Pussi Punk –  vocals on "Invisible Man"

References 

Bille, Torben (1997): Politikens Dansk Rock. Politikens Forlag 
Muhl, Lars (1993): Sjæl I Flammer. Hovedland

External links
First Shot Live at Discogs.com
Cha Cha Cha at Discogs.com

1979 live albums
Warm Guns albums